Nehren is the name of two communes in Germany:
Nehren, Baden-Württemberg, located in the district of Tübingen, Baden-Württemberg
Nehren, Rhineland-Palatinate, a village in the district Cochem-Zell, Rhineland-Palatinate